William B. McCreery (August 27, 1836 – December 9, 1896) was a Michigan politician and diplomat.

Early life
McCreery was born on August 27, 1836 in Mt. Morris, Livingston County, New York.  In 1859, he was admitted to the county bar.

Civil War
Initially assigned to Company F, Second Michigan Infantry, He was later a Lieutenant Colonel commanding the 21st Michigan Infantry with the Union Army in the Civil War.  He fought with valor and was serious wounded at Williamsburg, Virginia, and at Chickamauga. He was captured by the Confederates after being wounded at the Battle of Chickamauga.  He escaped in 1864 from Libby Prison in Richmond, Virginia reportedly by the way of a tunnel dug by himself and other prisoners.

After the war
Returning to Flint, McCreery enter the general merchandising business with  F. W. Judd then in the lumber industry with a sawmill on the banks of the Flint River just south of the Saginaw Road bridge.    In the Grant administration, he became the district collector of internal revenue.  He was involved in the Flint City Water Works Company as its president and as an original stockholders and in the Grand Trunk Railway Flint-Lansing extension construction.

Political life
He was elected as the ninth mayor of the City of Flint in 1865 serving two 1-year terms.  Elected Michigan State Treasurer in 1875 serving until 1878.  Appointed in 1890 as U.S. Consul in Valparaíso.

Post-political Life
He served as a director of First National Bank of Flint.  McCreery died on December 9, 1896 in Flint, Michigan and laid to rest at Glenwood Cemetery, Flint, Michigan.

References

Mayors of Flint, Michigan
State treasurers of Michigan
1836 births
1896 deaths
American consuls
Burials at Glenwood Cemetery (Flint, Michigan)
19th-century American politicians
19th-century American diplomats
Union Army colonels
American Civil War prisoners of war